Elizabeth Bravo (born 30 January 1987) is an Ecuadorian triathlete. She competed in the Women's event at the 2012 Summer Olympics. She finished in fourth place in the women's event at the 2015 Pan American Games. She competed at the 2020 Summer Olympics.

References

External links
 

1987 births
Living people
Ecuadorian female triathletes
Olympic triathletes of Ecuador
Triathletes at the 2012 Summer Olympics
Triathletes at the 2016 Summer Olympics
Triathletes at the 2007 Pan American Games
Triathletes at the 2011 Pan American Games
Triathletes at the 2015 Pan American Games
Triathletes at the 2019 Pan American Games
Pan American Games competitors for Ecuador
People from Cuenca, Ecuador
South American Games bronze medalists for Ecuador
South American Games medalists in triathlon
Competitors at the 2014 South American Games
Competitors at the 2018 South American Games
Triathletes at the 2020 Summer Olympics
20th-century Ecuadorian women
21st-century Ecuadorian women